Wired: The Short Life and Fast Times of John Belushi is a 1984 non-fiction book by American journalist Bob Woodward about actor and comedian John Belushi. The hardcover edition includes 16 pages of black-and-white photos, front and back.

Interviews
Many friends and relatives of Belushi, including his widow Judith Belushi Pisano, Dan Aykroyd, and James Belushi, agreed to be interviewed at length for the book, but later felt the final product was exploitative and not representative of the John Belushi they knew. Pisano wrote her own book, Samurai Widow (1990), to counter the image of Belushi portrayed in Wired.

Reception
In 2013, Tanner Colby, who co-authored the 2005 book Belushi: A Biography with Pisano, wrote about how Wired exposes Woodward's strengths and weaknesses as a journalist. While in the process of researching the anecdotes related in the book, he found that while many of them were true, Woodward missed, or didn't seek out, their meaning or context.

For example, in Woodward's telling, a "lazy and undisciplined" Belushi is guided through the scene on the cafeteria line in Animal House by director John Landis, yet other actors present for that scene recall how much of it was improvised by the actor in one single take. Blair Brown told author Tanner Colby that Woodward had "tricked" her into describing her and Belushi’s preparation for a love scene in Continental Divide, and Brown remained angry at Woodward years later while telling the story of Woodward’s deceitfulness. Colby notes that Woodward devotes a single paragraph to Belushi's grandmother's funeral, where he hit a low point and resolved to get clean for the filming of Continental Divide, while Woodward diligently documented every instance of drug abuse over a period of many years that he turned up. "It's like someone wrote a biography of Michael Jordan in which all the stats and scores are correct, but you come away with the impression that Michael Jordan wasn't very good at playing basketball," he concluded.

Dan Aykroyd denounced Wired publicly. Interviewed on television by Bobbie Wygant for NBC 5 in 1984, Aykroyd responded to the question of whether Woodward had interviewed him before writing the book:

Film adaptation
The book was later adapted into a critically panned 1989 feature film also called Wired, in which Belushi was played by Michael Chiklis and Woodward was played by J.T. Walsh.

External links
How "Wired" Betrayed John Belushi's Legacy and Misportrayed Addiction
Why John Belushi died|Interviews|Roger Ebert
Official Website

References

1984 non-fiction books
American biographies
Books by Bob Woodward
Simon & Schuster books
Biographies adapted into films
Unauthorized biographies